Rekhti, 
is a form of Urdu feminist poetry. A genre developed by male poets, it uses women's voices to talk about themselves. It was formed in 19th-century Lucknow, then part of the State of Awadh (now in Uttar Pradesh, India). The poet Saadat Yaar Khan Rangin is credited with its creation.

Written generally in ghazal form, it uses women's special idioms, mannerism and accents. Their topics include women-women and women-men affairs and also women's sensual desires and sexual urges.

History 
Prior to the 17th century, Persian was the main language of literature and poetry in Northern Hindustan, as well as a local language for many. As a gender-neutral language, the romantic and sexual aspects of its poetry were often ambiguous and open to interpretation. In contrast, Hindustani's emerging predecessor Hindavi/Dehlavi/Khariboli, used as a medium of oral communication in many parts of the Indian subcontinent, distinguished between genders. The nascent ghazal style of poetry was a popular mode of composition in this language. However, in the north, ghazals tended to be an expression of love from a male to a female.

The practice of writing poetry in the woman's voice was pioneered in the Deccan, by Muhammad Quli Qutb Shah, fifth ruler of the Golconda Sultanate. Here, the Khariboli dialect was known as Deccani due to some of its regional quirks. Qutb Shah composed ghazals in Deccani but used its gender-specific nature to write them from the female's perspective, which reversed the roles in the ghazal medium. This role-reversal was popular in the Deccan, employed by poets like Hashmi Bijapuri, Asadullah Wajhi, and Hasan Shauqi. Some examples:

The conquest of the Deccan by Aurangzeb brought the region into the fold of northern literary traditions, which spurred the development of the dialect in Delhi into Rekhta. The process also brought the role-reversal trend to the north, and it was only at this time (early 18th century) that the term Rekhti was coined. Here it was furthered by northern poets.

Famous exponents
 Saadat Yaar Khan 'Rangeen'
 Meer Yaar Alii 'Jaan Sahib'
 Mohsin Khan 'Mohsin'
 Insha Allah Khan 'Insha'

See also
Urdu poetry

References

Further reading
 Ruth Vanita, Gender, Sex and the City: Urdu Rekhti Poetry in India, 1780–1870, London: Palgrave Macmillan, 2012

Urdu-language poetry
LGBT poetry
Erotic poetry
Poems about sexuality
Feminist literature